A panty raid was an American college prank of the 1950s and early 1960s in which groups of male students attempted to invade the living quarters of female students and steal their panties (undergarments) as the trophies. The term dates to February 1949.

History
Panty raids were the first college craze after World War II, following 1930s crazes of goldfish swallowing, and of stuffing numbers of people into a phone booth. The mock battles that ensued between male and female students echoed the riotous battles between freshmen and upperclassmen, which were an annual ritual at many colleges in the 20th century.

The first documented incident occurred on February 25, 1949, at Augustana College, Rock Island, Illinois. Around 125 men entered the Woman's Building; the first party entered through heating tunnels beneath the building. Once inside, they unlocked the door for the remaining raiders to enter, locked the house mother in her apartment, and cut the light and phone lines. Although a few women reported missing undergarments, the goal was to cause commotion. The police arrived, and although no pranksters were charged, the news traveled, making headlines in the Chicago Tribune, Stars and Stripes, Time magazine, and The New York Times.

The next incident was on March 21, 1952, when University of Michigan students raided a dormitory, creating publicity that would spark panty raids across the nation. Penn State's first raid involved 2,000 males marching on the women's dorms on April 8, 1952, cheered on by the women, who opened doors and windows and tossed out lingerie. A May 1952 article in the Technique, Georgia Tech's student newspaper, reported that about 20 colleges had experienced panty raids, including several in the southeastern United States, such as Emory University, the University of Georgia, the University of Miami, and the University of North Carolina at Chapel Hill. By the end of the 1952 spring term the "epidemic" had spread to 52 campuses.

At a number of colleges, panty raids functioned as a humorous, ad hoc protest against curfews and entry restrictions that barred male visitors from women's dormitories. This was particularly the case at colleges that had recently started admitting women in large numbers for the first time after World War II, where the role of female students on campus had not yet been worked out. At some colleges the large, leaderless crowds that gathered around panty raids were co-opted by student politicians into protest and activism against dorm curfews and parietals. These stirrings of student protest against restrictive campus rules fed the sudden emergence in the late 1950s of liberal activist parties in student government, such as SLATE at Berkeley.

Generally, the women welcomed the raiders and in some cases raided men's colleges, such as Georgetown University in Washington, D.C. At the University of Washington, though, raiders broke windows, and female students at Columbia College and Stephens College fought raiders from the University of Missouri.

Raiding continued, such as the raid by Princeton University men on Westminster Choir College in spring 1953. The University of Nebraska was credited with the first panty raid of 1955, when hundreds raided the women's dorms, resulting in injuries and seven suspensions. The University of California, Berkeley had a 3,000-man panty raid in May 1956, which resulted in $10,000 damage (about $92,000 in 2018). At the University of Michigan, panty raids were associated with fall football pep rallies in addition to being a spring ritual in the 1950s and early 1960s.

The spring ritual continued into the 1960s. In 1961, three students were expelled from the University of Mississippi at Oxford, Mississippi for panty raids.

By the 1970s, mixed dorms and less inhibited attitudes to sexual intercourse on campus led to fading of panty raids.

In popular culture 
In the 1984 film Revenge of the Nerds, the Tri-Lambs stage a panty raid on the Pi Delta Pis sorority.

A panty raid was also depicted in the episode "Mid-Life Crustacean" from the television show SpongeBob SquarePants. Originally aired on Nickelodeon in 2003, the episode was discontinued by the network in 2018 and later made unavailable for streaming on Amazon Prime Video and Paramount+, the latter of which acts as the service for Nickelodeon parent Paramount Global. While inappropriate content was given as the cause of its embargo, a specific scene was never identified. However, Petey Oneto of IGN surmises that the panty raid is the scene in question.

In the "Mars University" episode (season 1, episode 11, first broadcast October 3, 1999) of the animated science fiction sitcom Futurama, Bender the robot leads the Epsilon Rho Rho "Robot House" fraternity in a panty raid in order to be "cool", although all they do is climb a ladder to look in the window. The episode is in large part a parody of the 1978 film Animal House.

See also

 Panty tree
 Phonebooth stuffing
 Gnomes (South Park)

References

1950s fads and trends
Practical jokes
Student culture in the United States
Undergarments
Theft